Optima Lake was built to be a reservoir in Texas County, Oklahoma. The site is just north of  Hardesty and east of Guymon in the Oklahoma Panhandle.

Rapid declines in streamflow related to large-scale pumping from the high plains aquifer system, also known as the Ogallala Aquifer, coincided with the completion of the dam, to make the reservoir a dramatic example of unanticipated environmental impacts.

The Corps' website states in part (emphasis in original):

"All public use areas around the lake are land access points only, and do not offer swimming, boating, fishing or camping opportunities. The water level in the lake has never reached normal pool. Visitors should be aware that the lake's level is very low, and is often times dry.  Visitors wanting to picnic or view wildlife should come for the quiet natural setting -- with or without water in the lake area."

The lake surroundings offer few to no amenities since lake camping facilities and buildings were dismantled for public safety by the Corps in 2010.

History
The project was originally included as part of the Flood Control Act of 1936, as modified by the Flood Control Act of 1950, but planning and political wrangling delayed the start of construction until 1966. The intent was for the reservoir to fill primarily from the flow of the Beaver River, also known as the North Canadian River. Normal flow on the Beaver River, from 1937 to 1966, averaged 32.2 cubic feet per second. In the end the project was authorized for flood control, drinking and irrigation water in the relatively dry Oklahoma panhandle, recreation, and fish and wildlife conservation.

The Guymon Chamber of Commerce, which enthusiastically backed the project, published a pamphlet that touted its expected virtues.
  
During the 12 years of construction by the U.S. Army Corps of Engineers, the flow of the Beaver dropped. It was later recognized that because the source of the Beaver was the underground Ogallala Aquifer, being the water table underlying far western Oklahoma and parts of seven other Western states, and due to increased takings from the aquifer for irrigation and drinking water, the river's flow was being reduced to a trickle.

The $46.1-million project was completed in 1978. The conservation pool was designed to hold  of water, with  designated to be available as a water supply. The Corps forecasted in 1979 that, "The optimum visitation for the project is 600,000 annual visitors and will be reached in 2014."

But water flow in the Beaver, 1977–1987, averaged only , far less than the  historical average. Subsequently, the flow in the Beaver dropped even further.

The Corps formally closed the park in 1995, although the site remained open to the public.  With funding from the American Recovery and Reinvestment Act of 2009, about 161 decaying structures including picnic enclosures, campsites, restrooms, dump stations, and numerous power poles, were demolished by September 2010 for safety reasons.  As of 2014, the project was receiving 2000 to 5000 visitors annually.

A spending controversy erupted in 2009, when the Corps wanted to use $1.2 million of economic stimulus money to replace rotting guardrails on each side of the paved road across the top of the Optima Dam used by approximately 15 cars a day.  Public criticism caused the Corps to instead gate and padlock the road at a cost of $1000.  The Corps' September 2010 Section 216 Initial Appraisal Report on Optima Lake indicated the Corps was spending approximately $160,000 per year for annual inspections of dam structures, detailed inspections at five year intervals, and repairs as budgets allowed.  That same report indicated that existing dam structures (gate tower, stilling basin, uncontrolled spillway and outlet works) remained in operational condition.

In the 1973 Environmental Impact Statement done by the Corps during the planning process, a "dry lake" option for the project was considered which would have provided for no water retention during normal periods, but would have created an area available as a flood containment pool in the event of abnormally large water events in the area. That concept for Optima was rejected in favor of an active water-containment reservoir; however, the project as it currently exists is consistent with the dry lake option.  The Beaver does occasionally still carry off surface flooding after heavy rains, as in April 2016 when the river was flowing near Guymon for the first time in decades following two days of intense rains that caused Texas County to be declared a disaster area.

References

 R. Lowitt, 2002.  "Optima Dam: A Failed Effort to Irrigate the Oklahoma Panhandle", Agricultural History, 76(2):260-72

External links
2006 Geological Society of America press release – Lessons to be learned from sites like Optima
USGS online discharge data for inflow to reservoir (1937–1993)
Optima Lake information on TravelOK.com Official travel and tourism website for the State of Oklahoma
 National Public Radio, 2013. "If You Want to Build a New Lake in Oklahoma, Forget History", NPR State Impact Oklahoma

Reservoirs in Oklahoma
Protected areas of Texas County, Oklahoma
Bodies of water of Texas County, Oklahoma
1978 establishments in Oklahoma